The Gospel According to Patti LaBelle is the first gospel album by American singer Patti LaBelle. It was released on November 21, 2006 through music executive Jheryl Busy's indie label Umbrella Recordings and Bungalo Records.

Background
The project began three years before its release when LaBelle's late musical director and close friend Budd Ellison told a skeptical LaBelle that "it's now or never, Patti." The album is dedicated to his memory as he succumbed to prostate cancer before the album saw a release. The Gospel According To Patti LaBelle features collaborations with Yolanda Adams, Mary Mary, Kanye West, Wynonna Judd, The Soul Seekers, Tye Tribbett, CeCe Winans and more. Production duties were handled by Gordon Chambers, J. Moss, Scott "Shavoni" Parker, Troy Taylor, Gerald Haddon, Jon DeLise, and others.

Critical reception

Allmusic editor Andree Farias found that "it's a pretentious title coming from someone who isn't a full-time practitioner in the genre [...] but this Gospel is nowhere near such transcendence, not by a long shot. There's enough marquee value to the proceedings to convince even the staunchest gospel head that LaBelle is for real [...] but the performances are too placid and middling, even by contemporary gospel standards [...] It's almost as if LaBelle were more concerned with putting together a get-together than paying homage to her church roots [...] Instead, Gospel is rife with ultra-slick urban stylings and excessive believe-in-yourself platitudes."

Commercial performance
The Gospel According to Patti LaBelle debuted on the US Billboard 200 at number 86, selling about 18,000 copies in its first week. It also peaked at number 17 on Billboards Top R&B/Hip-Hop Albums chart, and atop the Top Gospel Albums chart for 17 weeks. "Where Love Begins," a duet with Yolanda Adams was played frequently on R&B and gospel radio stations and debuted at number 68 on the Hot R&B/Hip-Hop Songs. Second single "Anything" featuring Kanye West, Mary Mary and Consequence hit number 64 on the same chart.

Awards
In 2008, the album was nominated for a Dove Award for Contemporary Gospel Album of the Year at the 39th GMA Dove Awards.

Track listing

Charts

Weekly charts

Year-end charts

References

External links
 

Gospel albums by American artists
2006 albums
Patti LaBelle albums